Authentic, nicknamed "Bud" (foaled June 22, 1995), is a Dutch Warmblood gelding that used to compete in show jumping. He has won three Olympic medals and two World Equestrian Games medals. He is owned by Abigail Wexner, and was ridden by Olympic medalist Beezie Madden. He was retired from competition in 2009 and is now in Cazanovia, NY, at the Madden's farm.

Pedigree

Competitive career 

In 2004, Authentic and Madden made double-clear rounds at the Athens Olympic Games which helped the U.S team win the gold medal. The team also won the $25,000 PDP WEP Challenge Cup Series Round V that same year.

In 2005 the pair were part of the American team that won its first ever Samsung Super League Nations' Cup.  In 2006, at the FEI World Equestrian Games, Authentic and Madden won the Individual and Team Silver medal, in doing so, Authentic jumped nine rounds without dropping a rail.  Recognizing these accomplishments, Authentic was named USEF Show Jumping Horse of the Year in both 2005 and 2006, and was named the 2006 Farnam/Platform United States Equestrian Federation Horse of the Year. In both 2006 and 2007, Authentic and Madden won the Budweiser American Invitational. In 2007, they won the Rolex Grand Prix of Aachen.

In 2008, Authentic and Madden won the $30,000 WEF Challenge Cup Round VIII, and the $200,000 CN Worldwide Grand Prix. The team next received the team show jumping gold medal and an individual bronze medal at the 2008 Beijing Olympic Games. Of particular note was the jump-off for the individual bronze, where Authentic jumped clean and with a fast time of 35.25 seconds on a shortened course where the time allowed was 40 seconds.

References

External links
 "U.S. Show Jumping Team Captures Gold."  The Horse, online edition, August 21, 2008.
Iron Spring Farm

Individual warmbloods
American show jumping horses
Olympic bronze medalists for the United States in equestrian
Horses in the Olympics
1995 animal births
Dutch Warmbloods